Hurt is an American dramatic, Gothic, horror-thriller film released in 2009. The film was directed by Barbara Stepansky and stars Melora Walters, William Mapother, Sofia Vassilieva, and Jackson Rathbone.

Synopsis
 
The Coltrane family's life has been devastated by an untimely death. Widowed Helen Coltrane (Melora Walters), along with her teenage son (Jackson Rathbone) and daughter, are given shelter by her reclusive and quirky gun-loving brother-in-law. As they grapple with the reality of their shattered, altered life and twist of fate, coincidence steps in with a seemingly lovely foster child (Sofia Vassilieva), who appears touting a story that Helen's husband had pledged to take her in. A macabre story of deception unfolds.

Cast

Production
The film was shot in California, more specifically Agua Dulce and Los Angeles. It was completed as of September 8, 2008 On September 1, 2008, the film's official website announced that Hurt would be represented by Inferno Films Productions (foreign sales) and Circus Road Films (domestic sales).

References

External links
 
 
 

2009 films
2009 horror films
2009 drama films
2009 psychological thriller films
American horror thriller films
American drama films
Films shot in California
Films shot in Los Angeles
Gothic horror films
2000s English-language films
2000s American films